Karaman, historically known as Laranda (Greek: Λάρανδα), is a city in south central Turkey, located in Central Anatolia, north of the Taurus Mountains, about  south of Konya. It is the capital district of the Karaman Province. According to the 2000 census, the population of the province is 231,872 of which 132,064 live in the town of Karaman. The Karaman Museum is one of the major sights.

Etymology
The town owes its name to Karaman Bey, who was one of the rulers of the Karamanid dynasty. The former name Laranda which in turn comes from the Luwian language Larawanda, literally means "sandy, a sandy place".

History

In ancient times, Karaman was known as Laranda. In the 6th century BC it came under Achaemenid rule until 322 BC, when it was destroyed by Perdiccas, a former general of Alexander the Great, after he had defeated Ariarathes I, king of Cappadocia.
It later became a seat of Isaurian pirates. At some point it was possessed by Antipater of Derbe.
It belonged to the Roman and later Byzantine Empires until it was captured by the Seljuks in the early 12th century. Karaman was occupied by Frederick Barbarossa in 1190 and by the Armenian Kingdom of Cilicia between 1211 and 1216. In 1256, the town was taken by Karaman Bey and was renamed Karaman in his honour. From 1275, Karaman was the capital of the Karamanid beylik.

In 1468 the Karamanids were conquered by the Ottomans and in 1483 the capital of the province was moved to Konya. Karaman has retained ruins of a Karamanid castle and some walls, two mosques and a Koran school (madrasah) from that age. A mihrab from a mosque from Karaman can now be found in the Çinili Pavilion near the Archeology Museum in Istanbul.
The Karamans were Cappadocian Turkomans who fought the Ottomans on the side of the Comnenes, became Christian and migrated westwards.

There was a Roman Catholic titular see for the city.
The poet Yunus Emre resided in Karaman during his later years and is believed to lie buried beside the Yunus Emre Mosque. A small adjacent park is adorned with quotations from his verse, many of them graffiti-splattered. In 1222, the Sufi preacher Bahaeddin Veled arrived in town with his family, and the Karamanoğlu emir built a madrasah to accommodate them. Veled's son was the famous Rumi, who married his wife, Gevher Hatun, while his family was living in Karaman. It was here, too, that Rumi's mother died in 1224. She was buried, along with other family members, in the Aktekke Mosque (also known as the Mader-i Mevlana Cami), which Alaeddin Ali Bey had built to replace the original madrasah in 1370.

When Thomas Jefferson fought Libya's Barbary pirates, he replaced one member of the al-Qaramanli dynasty with another as Pasha.

Notable people

 Nestor of Laranda, an epic poet, the father of the poet Peisander.
 Peisander of Laranda an epic poet, the son of the poet Nestor.

Karamanlides
The bearers of the Greek name Karamanlis as well as other surnames beginning with "Karaman" are a toponymic surname for the town.

Gallery

Climate
Karaman has a cold semi-arid climate under Köppen climate classification (BSk) and a continental climate under the Trewartha climate classification (Dc), with hot, dry summers and cold, snowy winters. Karaman is generally very sunny, with almost 3000 hours of sunshine per year.

See also
 Anatolian Tigers

References

External links

 
Archaeological sites in Central Anatolia
Cities in Turkey
Populated places in Karaman Province
Karamanids
Districts of Karaman Province
Lycaonia